Tom Clancy's Rainbow Six: Rogue Spear is a 1999 tactical first-person shooter video game developed and published by Red Storm Entertainment. It is the second installment in the Rainbow Six series and the last entry published by Red Storm before its acquisition by Ubisoft in 2000. The game's plot follows the international counterterrorist organization Rainbow as they investigate the potential acquisition of nuclear weapons by terrorists.

Rogue Spear is based on the same game engine and features gameplay and presentation similar to that of the original Rainbow Six. Rogue Spear focuses on realism, planning, strategy and teamwork. Tom Clancy's Rainbow Six: Rogue Spear was released for Microsoft Windows on August 31, 1999, with versions for the Mac OS (2000), Dreamcast (2000), PlayStation (2001), and Game Boy Advance (2002) released later. A PlayStation 2 port was also announced at the time, but it was later canceled. Rogue Spear's engine was later used for the 2003 South Korea-only spinoff Rainbow Six: Take-Down – Missions in Korea.

Plot
In 2001, Rainbow, a secret international counterterrorist organization led by John Clark, handles a spike in international terrorist attacks, including a hostage situation at the Metropolitan Museum of Art in New York City, an attempted tanker bombing in the Sea of Japan, an aircraft hijacking in Brussels, the attempted deployment of a nerve agent in Oman's water supply, the capture of NATO officials in Kosovo, and a Neo-Nazi group's takeover of a television studio in London.

Elsewhere, the former Eastern Bloc has fallen into economic and political disarray since the dissolution of the Soviet Union a decade prior, with conflict and terrorism increasing as money and necessities become scarce. The Russian mafia takes advantage of the turmoil, buying surplus military equipment from the impoverished Russian Armed Forces.

Investigating the Oman nerve agent, Rainbow, assisted by an anonymous informant, sources it to anti-Western oil baron Samed Vezirzade. Surveillance of Vezirzade leads Rainbow to an illegal arms deal in Russia between a Russian military unit and Russian mobsters connected to arms dealer Maxim Kutkin and Moscow kingpin Lukyan Barsukov. Rainbow is deployed to interrupt the deal and recovers weapons-grade plutonium, the rest of which they seize from a Russian Navy facility; the Russian colonel in charge of the facility admits he sold Kutkin plutonium multiple times prior, and Rainbow fears Kutkin may be building nuclear weapons. Rainbow hides surveillance devices in Vezirzade's mansion and Kutkin's private spa, but learn they are aware of Rainbow's activities after Vezirzade—revealed to have been supporting and using most of the terrorist groups recently encountered by Rainbow—sends a Neo-Marxist group to capture the Czech President as payback.

After saving the Czech President, Rainbow locates and assaults Kutkin's nuclear weapons facility in Siberia. Meanwhile, the informant leaves to "set things right"; Rainbow analyst Susan Holt learns the informant was Barsukov himself, who was personally suspicious of Kutkin (his son-in-law) and needed Rainbow's intelligence to confirm his suspicions. Rainbow destroys the facility and recovers two nuclear weapons, while Barsukov wages a gang war against Kutkin.

Suddenly, Holt and Barsukov are kidnapped by Kutkin, who captured them while attempting to assassinate Barsukov to take over his criminal empire; worse, Clark learns two additional nuclear weapons were not recovered from the Siberian facility. After freeing Holt and Barsukov, Rainbow learns Kutkin is personally moving the remaining nuclear weapons to a train yard in Moscow to be shipped out of Russia, and they intercept the shipment, securing the nuclear weapons and killing Kutkin.

With the nuclear threat rendered moot, Rainbow raids Vezirzade's fortress in Azerbaijan, killing Vezirzade when he fights the Rainbow operatives rather than surrender. However, Rainbow then learns Kutkin is still alive, having used a double to fake his death. Furious over his defeat, Kutkin seizes control of a nuclear power plant in Cherkasy, Ukraine, intent on causing a Chernobyl-esque nuclear meltdown to take as many lives with him as possible. Rainbow storms the power plant, killing Kutkin and preventing the meltdown.

The threat finally over, Clark debriefs the Rainbow operatives, noting that with Kutkin dead, his spa has been sold to Barsukov, who declares he has retired from crime and will settle down to operate the spa legally. However, after arriving at the spa, Barsukov suddenly turns his attention to a hidden camera left by Rainbow from the Kutkin surveillance operation. After personally rebuking Clark for invading his privacy, Barsukov shoots the camera with a pistol, preventing Rainbow from monitoring him.

Multiplayer 
Rogue Spear's online multiplayer consists of two modes: cooperative and adversarial. Cooperative mode has players team up to complete missions against AI-controlled enemies in formats similar to the single-player missions. Adversarial mode pits players against one another in deathmatch and team deathmatch modes. Rogue Spear does not support dedicated servers, with games being limited to sixteen players per server. An active competitive scene was formed around the game, with players forming clans and participating in ladder play.

Add-ons

Urban Operations
Rogue Spear Mission Pack: Urban Operations, released on April 4, 2000, was the first expansion for Rogue Spear. It was developed and published by Red Storm Entertainment. It added eight new maps and five classic Rainbow Six maps from the original game, as well as three new weapons. With the release of Urban Operations, a built-in mod system was added.

Urban Operations was later re-released by Kama Digital Entertainment in South Korea, including two exclusive missions and two new weapons.

Covert Ops Essentials
Rainbow Six: Covert Ops Essentials is a stand-alone expansion pack of Rogue Spear, released on September 28, 2000. Developed as an educational game and a training simulator, Covert Ops Essentials was developed by Magic Lantern Playware and published by Red Storm Entertainment. It includes nine new missions, six of which were made by Zombie Studios and three of which were made by Red Storm.

Covert Ops Essentials features the ability to read educational materials such as actual military field manuals, view video interviews from counterterrorism experts, take multiple-choice tests to progress in rank, and see live-fire demonstrations of the weapons included in the game. For the live-fire videos, Sergeant Anthony Levatino, a SWAT team leader of the Santa Ana Police Department, was contracted to provide content expertise for the educational material and for the on-camera demonstrations.

Black Thorn
Rogue Spear: Black Thorn was developed by Red Storm Entertainment and published by Ubisoft as a stand-alone add-on on December 15, 2001, featuring new singleplayer and multiplayer maps, along with new weapons and a new multiplayer game mode. The singleplayer plot features a mentally disturbed ex-SAS operative challenging Rainbow with reenactments of real-life terrorist attacks, such as Operation Entebbe and the Japanese embassy hostage crisis.

Reception

Rogue Spear was met with positive to mixed reception upon release.  GameRankings and Metacritic gave it a score of 85.97% for the PC version; 75.77% and 76 out of 100 for the Game Boy Advance version; 72.62% and 75 out of 100 for the Dreamcast version; and 60.07% for the PlayStation version.

In the United States, Rogue Spears sales reached 240,503 copies by April 2000. In the same country, the game's Platinum re-release sold another 240,000 copies and earned $7.7 million by August 2006, after its launch in October 2001. It was the country's 85th best-selling computer game between January 2000 and August 2006.

John Lee reviewed the PC version of the game for Next Generation, rating it four stars out of five, and stated that "More of the same, but then it's hard to ask for anything more."

Greg Orlando reviewed the Dreamcast version of the game for Next Generation, rating it four stars out of five, and stated that "A title that works on many different levels, Rogue Spear is a must-have for the Dreamcast-owning shooter fan."

The editors of PC Gamer US named Rogue Spear the best action game of 1999, and wrote, "Congratulations, Red Storm... in a loud market, you made the quiet revolution." Rogue Spear was a finalist for the Academy of Interactive Arts & Sciences' 1999 "Action Game of the Year" award, which ultimately went to Half-Life: Opposing Force.

Black Thorn

Expansion packs of the PC version received lower scores than the original release. The most recent was Black Thorn, which currently has a score of 71.92% on GameRankings, and 67 out of 100 on Metacritic.

References

External links
 Rainbow Six official website
 
 
 
 

1999 video games
Cancelled PlayStation 2 games
Classic Mac OS games
Cooperative video games
Dreamcast games
First-person shooters
Game Boy Advance games
Multiplayer and single-player video games
Multiplayer online games
Pipe Dream Interactive games
PlayStation (console) games
Tactical shooter video games
Take-Two Interactive games
Tom Clancy games
 02
Ubisoft games
Video games developed in Italy
Video games developed in the United States
Video games scored by Bill Brown
Video games set in 2001
Video games set in 2002
Video games set in 2003
Video games set in 2004
Video games set in Azerbaijan
Video games set in Belgium
Video games set in Bolivia
Video games set in Georgia (country)
Video games set in Japan
Video games set in Serbia
Video games set in Kosovo
Video games set in New York City
Video games set in Oman
Video games set in Russia
Video games set in the Czech Republic
Video games set in the United Kingdom
Video games set in Turkey
Video games set in Ukraine
Video games with expansion packs
Windows games
Red Storm Entertainment games